Hewitsoniella is a genus of skipper butterflies in the family Hesperiidae.

Species
Recognised species in the genus Hewitsoniella include:
 Hewitsoniella migonitis Hewitson, 1876

References

Natural History Museum Lepidoptera genus database
Hewitsoniella at funet

Trapezitinae
Hesperiidae genera